Sayyid Hassan Khomeini (born 23 July 1972) is an Iranian cleric. He has been called "the most prominent" grandchild of Ruhollah Khomeini, who had 15 grandchildren in total, and the one "who many think could have a promising political future".

Early life

Hassan Khomeini is a grandson of the founder of the Islamic Republic of Iran, Ruhollah Khomeini. He is the son of Ahmad Khomeini and Fatemeh Tabatabai. He has four children.

Career
Hassan Khomeini became a cleric in 1993. He was appointed caretaker of the Mausoleum of Khomeini in 1995 where his grandfather and father are buried, and has had official meetings with officials such as Syrian President Bashar al-Assad and Hezbollah Secretary-General Hassan Nasrallah. He also teaches in the holy city of Qom, and has published his first book on Islamic sects.

He has been described as having "expressed frustration with some policies of a regime dominated by fundamentalists", such as former President Mahmoud Ahmadinejad. In an interview in February 2008, Khomeini spoke out against military interference in politics.  Soon after, in what some observers  believe may have been retaliation, an article in a publication tied to President Ahmadinejad accused him of corruption, "claiming that he drove a BMW, backed rich politicians and was indifferent to the suffering of the poor".

This was "the first time in the history of the Islamic Republic" that one of Khomeini's offspring was "publicly insulted", according to the Iranian daily newspaper Kargozaran. Khomeini met with reformers before the 2009 election and met with defeated presidential candidate Mir-Hossein Mousavi and "supported his call to cancel the election results".

On 9 December 2015, he announced that he would enter politics and run for the Assembly of Experts in the 2016 election. His nomination was rejected by the Guardian Council on 10 February 2016.

In June 2020, Iranian media speculated that he would be a presidential candidate in the 2021 election, although he declined to stand on the advice of Supreme Leader Ali Khamenei.

References

1972 births
Al-Moussawi family
Iran's Book of the Year Awards recipients
21st-century Iranian politicians
Iranian reformists
Iranian Shia clerics
Living people
People from Qom
Ruhollah Khomeini